The black-and-white triller (Lalage melanoleuca) is a species of bird in the family Campephagidae. It is endemic to the Philippines.

Its natural habitat is subtropical or tropical moist lowland forests.

Description 
Medium, sexes differ, races vary in size and extent of extent of gray in lower back in male, or relative darkness of the grey in female. in melanoleuca female top of head, upper back, most of tail and wing black glossed with green; center of black gray; rump, tips of outer tail feathers, median wing coverts, edges of greater coverts and secondaries (all forming a broad white wing bar), inner edges to primaries, underwing and underparts pure white. female differs by having head and upper back light gray, rump and underparts grayish white finely barred with darker gray; undertail coverts white; Bill black; eye dark brown; legs dark grayish black.

References

 A Guide to the birds of the philippines(2000) Robert S. Kennedy pedro C. Gonzales, Edward C, Dickinson Hector C. Miranda, jr. & Timothy H. Fisher

black-and-white triller
Endemic birds of the Philippines
black-and-white triller
black-and-white triller
Taxonomy articles created by Polbot